Erle Daniel Baugher, IV  (born January 24, 1984) is a former American football punter. He was signed by the Cincinnati Bengals as an undrafted free agent in 2006. He played college football at Arizona.

Baugher was also a member of the New England Patriots, Rhein Fire, Denver Broncos, Las Vegas Locomotives, Atlanta Falcons and Oakland Raiders.

College career
Baugher attended the University of Arizona, where he was a finalist for the Ray Guy Award in 2005.

Professional career

Cincinnati Bengals
Baugher was signed as an undrafted free agent after the 2006 NFL Draft by the Cincinnati Bengals, but was released at the start of training camp.

New England Patriots/Rhein Fire
On October 10, 2006, he was signed to the Patriots' practice squad but was released on August 29, 2007. He played for the Rhein Fire during the 2007 season and was named to the All-League team.

Second stint with Bengals
Baugher was signed a second time by the Bengals on February 5, 2008 and released on April 5, 2008.

Denver Broncos
Baugher was then signed by the Denver Broncos as a free agent on April 5, 2008 and released June 13, 2008. On December 2, 2008, Baugher worked out for the Green Bay Packers but was not signed.

Las Vegas Locomotives
Baugher was drafted by the Las Vegas Locomotives in the UFL Premiere Season Draft and signed with the team on August 31, 2009. He played for the team from 2009 to 2012.

Atlanta Falcons
Baugher was signed to the practice squad of the Atlanta Falcons on January 1, 2010.

Oakland Raiders
Baugher was signed by the Oakland Raiders on December 21, 2010 to their practice squad as a potential backup to Shane Lechler. He was released on December 28.

Personal life
His grandfather Erle Baugher played one season in the American Association/American Football League for the Wilmington Clippers during 1948.

References

External links
New England Patriots bio
Just Sports Stats

1984 births
Living people
People from Newton, New Jersey
Players of American football from New Jersey
American football punters
Arizona Wildcats football players
Cincinnati Bengals players
New England Patriots players
Rhein Fire players
Denver Broncos players
Las Vegas Locomotives players
Atlanta Falcons players
Oakland Raiders players